Dalcroze eurhythmics, also known as the Dalcroze method or simply eurhythmics, is one of several developmental approaches including the Kodály method, Orff Schulwerk and Suzuki Method used to teach music to students. Eurhythmics was developed in the early 20th century by Swiss musician and educator Émile Jaques-Dalcroze. Dalcroze eurhythmics teaches concepts of rhythm, structure, and musical expression using movement, and is the concept for which Dalcroze is best known. It focuses on allowing the student to gain physical awareness and experience of music through training that takes place through all of the senses, particularly kinesthetic.

Eurhythmics often introduces a musical concept through movement before the students learn about its visual representation. This sequence translates to heightened body awareness and an association of rhythm with a physical experience for the student, reinforcing concepts kinesthetically. Eurhythmics has wide-ranging applications and benefits and can be taught to a variety of age groups. Eurhythmics classes for all ages share a common goal – to provide the music student with a solid rhythmic foundation through movement in order to enhance musical expression and understanding.

Émile Jaques-Dalcroze and the origins of eurhythmics

Jaques-Dalcroze was appointed Professor of Harmony at the Conservatoire of Geneva in 1892, early in his career. As he taught his classes, he noticed that his students deeply needed an approach to learning music that included a kinesthetic component. He believed that in order to enhance and maximize musical expression, students needed to be trained early on to listen and appreciate music using both their minds and bodies. This coordination of mind and physical instincts formed the basis of his method.

Ready to develop and employ an improved, integrated style of music education at the Conservatoire, Dalcroze discovered some obstacles. He found that students with innate rhythmic abilities were rare, just as are those with absolute, or "perfect," pitch. In response to his observations, he asserted that in order to develop rhythmic ability in his students, he must first, and as early as possible in their development, train them in exercises that utilized the entire body. Only when the student's muscles and motor skills were developed could they be properly equipped to interpret and understand musical ideas. As he mentioned in the foreword of his "Rhythm, Music, and Education," he sought the "connection between instincts for pitch and movement…time and energy, dynamics, and space, music and character, music and temperament, [and] finally the art of music and the art of dancing.”

Because of the nature of his goals in expanding music education, his ideas are readily applicable to young students. An objective of his was to "musicalize" young children in order to prepare them for musical expression in future instrumental studies. He believed exposure to music, an expanded understanding of how to listen, and the training of gross and fine motor skills would yield faster progress later on in students’ musical studies. Related to this was his goal to sow the seeds of musical appreciation for future generations.

As stated concisely by Claire-Lise Dutoit in her "Music Movement Therapy," successful eurhythmics lessons have the following three attributes in common:

“The vital enjoyment of rhythmic movement and the confidence that it gives; the ability to hear, understand and express music in movement; [and] the call made on the pupil to improvise and develop freely his own ideas.”

Influences on the development of eurhythmics

Before taking a post teaching theory, Émile Jaques-Dalcroze spent a year as a conductor in Algiers, where he was exposed to a rhythmic complexity that helped influence him to pay special attention to rhythmic aspects of music.

Jaques-Dalcroze also had an important friendship with Édouard Claparède, the renowned psychologist. In particular, their collaboration resulted in eurhythmics often employing games of change and quick reaction in order to focus attention and increase learning.

Current applications

General education

Eurhythmics classes are often offered as an addition to general education programs, whether in preschools, grade schools, or secondary schools. In this setting, the objectives of eurhythmics classes are to introduce students with a variety of musical backgrounds to musical concepts through movement without a specific performance-related goal.

For younger students, eurhythmics activities often imitate play. Games include musical storytelling, which associates different types of music with corresponding movements of the characters in a story. The youngest of students, who are typically experiencing their first exposure to musical knowledge in a eurhythmics class, learn to correlate types of notes with familiar movement; for example the quarter note is represented as a "walking note." As they progress, their musical vocabulary is expanded and reinforced through movement.

Performance-based applications

While eurhythmics classes can be taught to general populations of students, they are also effective when geared toward music schools, either preparing students to begin instrumental studies or serving as a supplement to students who have already begun musical performance.

Aspects of a rhythmic curriculum

Vocabulary

Eurhythmics classes for students in elementary school through college and beyond can benefit from a rhythmic curriculum that explores rhythmic vocabulary. This vocabulary can be introduced and utilized in a number of different ways, but the primary objective of this component is to familiarize students with rhythmic possibilities and expand their horizons. Activities such as rhythmic dictation, composition, and the performance of rhythmic canons and polyrhythms can accommodate a wide range of meters and vocabulary. In particular, vocabulary can be organized according to number of subdivisions of the pulse.

Movement

A key component of a rhythmic education, movement provides another way of reinforcing rhythmic concepts - kinesthetic learning serves as a supplement to visual and aural learning. While the study of traditional classroom music theory reinforces concepts visually and encourages students to develop aural skills, the study of eurhythmics solidifies these concepts through movement. In younger students, the movement aspect of a rhythmic curriculum also develops musculature and gross motor skills. Ideally, most activities that are explored in eurhythmics classes should include some sort of kinesthetic reinforcement.

Meter and Syncopation

Another element of a rhythmic curriculum is the exploration of meter and syncopation. In particular, the study of meter should incorporate an organization of pulses and subdivisions. This organization can be expressed in a "meter chart," which can include both equal-beat and unequal-beat meters.

The study of syncopation, a broad term that can involve a variety of rhythms that fall unexpectedly or somehow displace the pulse, is also essential in a rhythmic education. Eurhythmics classes can incorporate various activities to explore syncopation, including complex rhythmic dictations, the performance of syncopated rhythms, the exploration of syncopated rhythms in canon, and a general discussion of syncopated vocabulary.

Sample activities

Ages 3–6:
 Warm-up activities: The students isolate and shake each body part, each one accompanied by different music. 
 Notes: Students learn about musical notation through associated movements. For example, quarter notes would be taught as “walking notes”. After familiarity with associated movements, note names are then introduced.
 Storytelling: The teacher invents a story or uses a familiar storyline to incorporate rhythmic concepts
 Ball games: Students pass a ball around in different ways, exploring naturally occurring rhythm and developing motor skills
 Games with sticks: The students jump across a series of sticks on the floor, learning to coordinate body parts and their associated rhythm.
 Drum activities: The students participate with small drums, getting to reproduce rhythm in an instrumental context

Ages 7+ (activities can be adapted to different age groups) 
 Swings: The teacher plays music improvised in a preset metrical pattern. The students use prescribed body motions to determine the pattern.
 Rhythmic dictation: The teacher plays a number of measures of music repeatedly, the rhythm of which the students dictate.
 Rhythms: Students clap or step a predetermined rhythmic pattern. The teacher can experiment with augmentation and diminution.
 Small group activities: Students work together in small groups to accomplish rhythmic tasks, encouraging cooperation. 
 Ball games: Students pass a ball around in different ways, exploring naturally occurring rhythm and developing motor skills.
 Tempos: Students work to discover different tempos that can be applied to classical repertoire, familiar songs, or everyday movements. The teacher can also lead in experimenting with tempo relationships and adjustment.
 Polyrhythms: The teacher establishes two rhythms to be performed at once, one in the hands and one in the feet.
 Cross rhythms:  Students produce one even rhythm in the hands against another even rhythm in the feet. The teacher prompts them to switch which rhythm is produced in each body part.
 “Cosmic Whole Note”: Students listen to a slow pulse (an example would be 6 beats per minute), subdivide the space between sounds, and predict when the next pulse sounds by clapping.
 Canon: Students listen to rhythmic vocabulary performed by the teacher and step this vocabulary in canon. This activity can be executed in a variety of meters. 
 “Microbeats”: Students learn syllables to represent 1-9 subdivisions of a beat. Associated activities could include performing microbeats in prescribed patterns, at varying tempi, in canon, or as sight-reading.

Effectiveness of Dalcroze eurhythmics
A group of 72 pre-school children were tested on their rhythmic ability; half of the children had free-play (35–40 min.) twice a week for a 10-week period while the other half had rhythmic movement classes for the same amount of time. The group that had classes (experimental group) did significantly better than the group that just had free-play (control group). The experiment group scored four or more points better in every area tested than the control group in the final test. This shows that eurhythmic classes can benefit a child’s sense of rhythm.

Higher education course offerings in eurhythmics
 Baldwin Wallace University offers a Solfege / Eurythmics course as part of its conservatory program https://www.bw.edu/schools/conservatory-music/
 Longy School of Music of Bard College has an extensive program, including Dalcroze certificate and license training
 Carnegie Mellon University, as part of the Martha Sanchez Dalcroze Training Center
 Cleveland Institute of Music offers an Eurhythmics program. It includes degree programs for both intermediate (college level) eurhythmics and children's eurhythmics.
 Hope College offers various Dalcroze eurythmics courses for music and dance majors/minors
Ohio State University courses for music and dance majors/minors
 Colorado State University
 Oberlin Conservatory of Music
 Stony Brook University
University of Cincinnati – College-Conservatory of Music offers eurhythmics as part of their Percussion pedagogy

Further reading
 Abramson, Robert M. Rhythm Games for Perception and Cognition. New York: Music and Movement Press, 1973. 
 Agrell, Jeffrey. Improvisation games for classical musicians : a collection of musical games with suggestions for use : for performers, instrumental teachers, music students, music therapists, bands, orchestras, choirs, chamber music ensembles, conductors, composers, pianists, percussionists, and everybody else (even jazz players). Chicago: GIA Publications, c2008.
 Alperson, Ruth. A qualitative study of Dalcroze eurhythmics classes for adults. 1995.
 American Dalcroze Journal, from the Dalcroze Society of America
 Berger, Linda Marie. The effects of Dalcroze eurhythmics instruction on selected music competencies of third- and fifth-grade general music students. 1999.
 Berkowitz, Sol. Improvisation through keyboard harmony. Englewood Cliffs, NJ: Prentice-Hall, 1975. 
 Caldwell, J. Timothy. Dalcroze eurhythmics with Robert M. Abramson [video recording]. Chicago, Il. : GIA Publications, c1992.

See also
 Eurythmy, the art of articulating movement originated by Marie von Sivers and Rudolf Steiner in the early 20th century. The word derives from Greek roots meaning beautiful or harmonious rhythm.
 Gurdjieff movements, a system of movement developed by G. I. Gurdjieff and Jeanne de Salzmann in the early to the late 20th century.

References

 Hansen, Kristen S., "A Musical Game for Every Age-Group." Teaching Music, Vol. 9 Issue 1. EBSCOhost. UWEC McIntyre Library Eau Claire WI. Dec. 1 2006
 Mead, Virginia Hoge, "More than Mere Movement: Dalcroze Eurhythmics." Music Educators Journal Feb 1986 v72 n6 p42-46 ERIC EBSCOhost. UWEC McIntyre Library, Eau Claire, WI. 1 December 2006
 Johnson, Monica Dale, "Dalcroze Skills of All Teachers", Music Educators Journal. ERIC. EBSCOhost. UWEC McIntyre Library, Eau Claire, WI 1 December 2006
 Swaiko, Nancy. "The Role and Value of a Eurhythmics Program in a Curriculum of Deaf Children." American Annals of the Deaf Jun74 119, 3, 321-4. ERIC. EBSCOhost. UWEC McIntyre Library, Eau Claire, WI. 1 December 2006.
 Waller, Johnny, and Steve Rapport. Sweet Dreams: the Definitive Biography of Eurythmics. Toronto: Stoddart, 1985. 
Jaques-Dalcroze, Emile. Rhythm, Music & Education. London & Whitstable: The Riverside Press Ltd., 1967. (First published 1921)
Findlay, Elsa. Rhythm and Movement: Applications of Dalcroze Eurhythmics. Evanston: Summy-Birchard Company, 1971.
Bachmann, Marie-Laure. Dalcroze Today: an Education through and into Music. Oxford: Clarendon Press, 1991.
Dutoit, Claire-Lise. Music Movement Therapy. London: The Riverside Press Ltd, 1965.
Jaques-Dalcroze, Emile. Eurhythmics Art and Education. London: Chatto & Windus, 1930.

External links
 Dalcroze Society of America
 American Eurhythmics Society
 Dalcroze Council of Australia
 Dalcroze Canada
 Musikinesis has a few pieces of music by Jaques-Dalcroze that can be freely downloaded in PDF format
 Dalcroze Society UK
 Dalcroze international website

Music education
Dalcroze Eurhythmics